African Raw Material Vol. 1 is the debut studio album by South African rap group Cashless Society. The album was released on Unreleased Records and was distributed by BMG Africa. The song "Hottentot Hop (Bantu 1, 2)" had a music video released in 2003, followed by "Taxi Wars" which had a music video as well released in 2004. The song "8-3-1 (I Love You)" was then featured on the Yizo Yizo 3 soundtrack.

Released as an enhanced CD, the enhanced portion includes a Press Kit (Bio, Pictures and Wallpaper), and a video clip of Cashless Society performing live on YFM. The album won Best Hip-Hop Album at the South African Music Awards in 2004, with the single "Hottentot Hop (Bantu 1, 2)" winning both Best South African Rap Song and Best South African Music Video as well. The album finished in the Top 10 selling South African albums for 2004 in tenth place.

Track listing

Personnel
 Draztik – performer, executive producer
 Gemini – performer, producer, mixing
 Snazz D – performer, producer
 X-Amount – vocals
 Fat Free – vocals
 Black Intellect – vocals
 Tizeye – vocals
 Criminal – vocals
 Maggz – vocals
 Mizchif – vocals
 Norm Gates – vocals
 Cuba – vocals
 Tumi – vocals
 Masauko – producer

Awards

Awards Won

References

External links
 African Raw Material on Discogs.com

2003 debut albums
Cashless Society albums